The Econlockhatchee River (Econ River for short) is an  north-flowing blackwater tributary of the St. Johns River. The Econ River flows through Osceola, Orange, and Seminole counties in Central Florida, just east of the Orlando Metropolitan Area (east of State Road 417). It is a designated Outstanding Florida Waters.

The origin of the river's name is not known definitively. In 1839 the spelling was recorded as “Econ-like Hatchee”. It is theorized that this represents a Muscogee name meaning “earth-mound stream”, with “econ-like” coming from ēkvnv (/iːkaná/), ‘earth, land’, and like (/léyki/), ‘sitting’, plus hvcce (/háčči/), ‘stream’.

The river flows north from its source, Lake Conlin, through the Econlockhatchee River Swamp (see below) south of State Road 528. Near the City of Oviedo, the tributary Little Econlockhatchee River joins, and the river turns east as it flows through the Little Big Econ State Forest. The Econlockhatchee joins the St. Johns River near Puzzle Lake. The river's floodplain is forested for its entire length.

Econlockhatchee River Swamp 
The upper course of the river is called the Econlockhatchee River Swamp. South of State Road 532, the swamp is known as Cat Island Swamp, named after an island near County Road 500A. The river is at its widest (1.6 km) here, bordered by Lake Preston to the west. The Disston Canal joins Lake Mary Jane and Lake Hart to the swamp. Turkey Creek Bay is an arm of the swamp, through which the tributary Turkey Creek flows. North of Wewahootee Road, the Econlockhatchee River leaves the swamp and remains a free-flowing river for the rest of its journey to the St. Johns River.

List of crossings

Gallery

River views

Fauna

See also 
List of Florida rivers
Hal Scott Preserve
Oviedo, Florida
Wedgefield, Florida  formerly known as "Rocket City"

References

External links

 Econlockhatchee River Paddling Trail maps and information from the Florida Department of Environmental Protection

 
Outstanding Florida Waters
Rivers of Orange County, Florida
Rivers of Seminole County, Florida
Rivers of Osceola County, Florida